Isolated atrial amyloidosis is a form of amyloidosis affecting the atria of the heart.

It is associated with accumulation of the protein atrial natriuretic factor. It may cause abnormal heart rhythms.

References

Amyloidosis
Heart diseases
Protein folding